Jill Amy Whelan (born 28 December 1986) is an Irish former cricketer who played as a right-arm medium bowler. She played 29 One Day Internationals and 8 Twenty20 Internationals for Ireland between 2004 and 2011, and was part of Ireland's squad for the 2005 Women's Cricket World Cup.

References

External links
 
 

1986 births
Ireland women One Day International cricketers
Ireland women Twenty20 International cricketers
Irish women cricketers
Living people
Cricketers from Dublin (city)